Katherine LaNasa (born December 1, 1966) is an American actress, former ballet dancer and choreographer. She starred in films Jayne Mansfield's Car, The Campaign, and The Frozen Ground. On television, LaNasa had a leading role in the NBC sitcom Three Sisters (2001–2002) and Truth be Told (2019-present), appeared in  recurring roles on Judging Amy, Two and a Half Men, Big Love and Longmire, and starred in the short-lived dramas Love Monkey (2006), Deception (2013), Satisfaction (2014–15) and Imposters (2017–18). In 2020, LaNasa portrayed Gloria Grandbilt in the musical dramedy series Katy Keene.

Early life
LaNasa was born in New Orleans, Louisiana, the daughter of Anne (née Hardin) and Dr. James J. LaNasa Jr., a surgeon.

She began dancing at the age of 12, and at the age of 14, she was admitted to the North Carolina School of the Arts in Winston-Salem, North Carolina. After an apprenticeship with Milwaukee Ballet, LaNasa danced with Salt Lake City's Ballet West and the Karole Armitage Ballet.

Career

LaNasa assisted John Carrafa with the choreography for the 1989 film Rooftops. She made her feature film debut with a small role in the 1990 film Catchfire and in following years appeared in supporting roles in film and television.

LaNasa guest starred on number of television series, including Seinfeld, 3rd Rock from the Sun, Touched by an Angel, and The Practice, and in 2001 landed the lead role of Bess Bernstein-Flynn Keats in the NBC comedy series Three Sisters (2001–2002) opposite Dyan Cannon, A. J. Langer, and Vicki Lewis. The series was cancelled after two seasons in 2002. She later had recurring roles in Judging Amy as Yvonne Dunbar, as Kim McPherson on The Guardian, and as Michelle Colohan on NYPD Blue. Her other television credits include guest roles on CSI: Crime Scene Investigation, Grey's Anatomy, ER, House M.D., Justice, and Two and a Half Men. LaNasa had series regular roles in short-lived CBS comedy-drama Love Monkey (2006), playing Karen Freed, and on HBO comedy 12 Miles of Bad Road, as Juliet Shakespeare. LaNasa appeared as Beverly Ford on Big Love from 2009 to 2011. LaNasa appeared in a number of motion pictures during her career. In 2011, after a decade of making various television appearances, she had roles opposite Will Ferrell and Zach Galifianakis in the 2012 political comedy The Campaign, and 2013 thriller The Frozen Ground. Before this, she had a role in Billy Bob Thornton's drama film Jayne Mansfield's Car, originally created for Robin Wright. Her other film credits include Kiss & Tell (1996), Schizopolis (1996), Alfie (2004), and Valentine's Day (2010).

In 2012, LaNasa was cast as socialite Sophia Bowers in another NBC series Deception, which premiered as a mid-season replacement during the 2012–13 television season. The soap-type series was canceled after single season, ending it on a cliffhanger, in May 2013. She appeared in a recurring role as Lizzie Ambrose on A&E series Longmire from 2012 to 2013. In November 2013, LaNasa was cast as Adrianna, a madam who has a male escort service, in the USA Network drama Satisfaction opposite Matt Passmore. The series premiered on July 17, 2014, and was canceled after two seasons in 2015. In October 2014, she was cast alongside Ana Ortiz, Jeremy Sisto and Tyler Blackburn in the gay-drama Love is All You Need?, based on the 2011 short film with the same name.

In 2016, LaNasa had a recurring role in the Lifetime comedy-drama Devious Maids. From 2017 to 2018, she was series regular on the Bravo comedy series, Imposters. In 2018, LaNasa joined the cast of the CW prime time soap opera Dynasty playing villainous criminal mastermind Ada Stone during the second season. In 2019, she appeared in the Apple TV drama series Truth Be Told opposite Octavia Spencer. She was cast as a series regular on the 2020 CW series Katy Keene.

Personal life
LaNasa, at the age of 22, married 53-year-old actor Dennis Hopper in June 1989; the couple divorced in April 1992. Hopper and LaNasa had a son, Henry Lee Hopper (born 1990).

On May 19, 1998, she married actor French Stewart. They met when she made a guest appearance on a 1996 episode ("Green-Eyed Dick") of 3rd Rock from the Sun. The two divorced in December 2009. In July 2012, LaNasa became engaged to actor Grant Show, marrying him a few weeks later, on August 18.
She gave birth to the couple's first child, daughter Eloise McCue, on March 21, 2014.

Filmography

Film

Television

References

External links

1966 births
20th-century American actresses
21st-century American actresses
Actresses from New Orleans
American ballerinas
American choreographers
American film actresses
American television actresses
Living people
University of North Carolina School of the Arts alumni